Demorest is a city in Habersham County, Georgia, United States. The population was 1,823 at the 2010 census, up from 1,465 at the 2000 census. It is the home of Piedmont University.

Geography

Demorest is located in south-central Habersham County at  (34.564948, -83.543920). U.S. Route 441 Business (signed "U.S. 441 Historic Route") runs through the center of town as Central Avenue, leading north  to Clarkesville, the county seat, and south 4 miles to Cornelia.

Demographics

2020 census

As of the 2020 United States Census, there were 2,022 people, 664 households, and 395 families residing in the city.

2000 census
As of the 2000 census, there were 1,465 people, 498 households, and 292 families residing in the city. The racial makeup of the city was 92.70% White, 3.96% African American, 0.55% Native American, 0.61% Asian, 0.07% Pacific Islander, 1.77% from other races, and 0.34% from two or more races. Hispanic or Latino of any race were 3.34% of the population.

There were 498 households, out of which 23.7% had children under the age of 18 living with them, 43.2% were married couples living together, 12.9% had a female householder with no husband present, and 41.2% were non-families. 36.9% of all households were made up of individuals, and 14.5% had someone living alone who was 65 years of age or older.  The average household size was 2.12 and the average family size was 2.77.

In the city, the population was spread out, with 15.1% under the age of 18, 28.6% from 18 to 24, 21.4% from 25 to 44, 17.6% from 45 to 64, and 17.3% who were 65 years of age or older.  The median age was 32 years. For every 100 females, there were 84.5 males.  For every 100 females age 18 and over, there were 80.6 males.

The median income for a household in the city was $31,382, and the median income for a family was $39,917. Males had a median income of $29,485 versus $24,861 for females. The per capita income for the city was $14,981.  About 7.8% of families and 12.2% of the population were below the poverty line, including 17.2% of those under age 18 and 7.2% of those age 65 or over.

History

The land where Demorest is now located was given by the State of Georgia to W. Stripling in 1829. Stripling did little with the land aside from maintaining a family farm. In 1840, the land was transferred to Dr. Paul Rossignol who built a summer home on the west side of Lake Demorest. That house became significant to the history of Demorest. Among other things, it was one of the first buildings used by Piedmont College, now Piedmont University, which was established in 1897.

Demorest was platted in 1890 as a temperance town, and named after William Jennings Demorest, a prohibition advocate. Georgia General Assembly incorporated the place as the "City of Demorest" in 1889.

Notable landmarks

Notable landmarks in the city include Demorest Springs Park, the Old Demorest Train Depot, Demorest Women's Club and the former Lake Demorest.

One of Demorest's most popular landmarks is the Johnny Mize Athletic Center and Museum. The museum is owned by Piedmont University and is named for Baseball Hall of Famer Johnny Mize. Mize was born in Demorest, and played baseball at Piedmont. The museum houses Mize memorabilia from his time at Piedmont as well as from his professional baseball career with the St. Louis Cardinals, New York Giants and the New York Yankees. In addition to the museum, Mize's childhood home is a Georgia Historical site with a private owner.

The most recent landmark is the new addition of the pedestrian bridge over a span of Historic U.S. 441 in front of the Piedmont University campus. The new bridge was assembled off-site and lowered into place by crane. The bridge was modeled after the Vanderbilt University 21st Avenue Pedestrian Bridge. The installation of the bridge was a joint project of the Georgia Department of Transportation, Piedmont College and the city of Demorest.

References

External links
 

Cities in Georgia (U.S. state)
Cities in Habersham County, Georgia